Saadat Malook Shazada (born 26 August 1916, date of death unknown) was an Afghanistan field hockey player, who competed at the 1936 Summer Olympic Games and played in both games. He reportedly later lived in Washington, D.C. with a wife and child and worked in the World Bank, dying at a fairly young age. He was a grandfather of Canadian food writer Shayma Saadat, author of the Spice Spoon culinary blog.

References

External links
 

Afghan male field hockey players
Olympic field hockey players of Afghanistan
Field hockey players at the 1936 Summer Olympics
1916 births
Year of death missing
Afghan expatriates in the United States